Shi Mengyao is a Chinese sport shooter. She represents China at the 2020 Summer Olympics in Tokyo.

References

1998 births
Living people
Chinese female sport shooters
Shooters at the 2020 Summer Olympics
Olympic shooters of China
Sport shooters from Henan